Carbonized were a Swedish avant-garde metal band formed 1988 in Saltsjöbaden. The band was formed by Lars Rosenberg in 1988, with Dismember vocalist Matti Kärki. Joined by drummer Piotr Wawrzeniuk, the trio was completed by Therion's Christofer Johnsson, who originally agreed to only perform session guitarwork but eventually became a full-time member.

The band never officially split up, but stopped being active after recording the Screaming Machines album in 1994 (released 1996).

Music
Quite different from anything that any of the members would become involved in later, the three albums ran the gamut from psychedelic infused grindcore on For The Security to discordant jazz-metal weirdness on Disharmonization to something more avant-garde on Screaming Machines, and described as "the worst of Sonic Youth, Syd Barret era Pink Floyd, old Black Flag, and Voivod" by Christofer Johnsson. Both Rosenberg and Wawrzeniuk were featured on a few Therion albums through Christofer Johnsson, and they also paired up in the doom band Serpent.

Band members

Current members
Christofer Johnsson – guitar, vocals
Lars Rosenberg – bass guitar, vocals
Piotr Wawrzeniuk – drums

Former members
Matti Kärki – vocals
Jonas Derouche – vocals, guitar
Markus Rüdén – drums
Stefan Ekström – guitar
Per Ax – drums

Discography

Studio albums
For the Security (1991)
Disharmonization (1993)
Screaming Machines (1996)

Singles
"No Canonization" (1990)

Splits
Chronology of Death (with Sentenced, Bluuurgh... and Xenophobia) (1991)

Demos
Au-to-dafe (1989)
Recarbonized (1990) on Witchhunt Records -  Believe in Church and Agonize
Two Faces (1990) on Witchhunt Records -  Believe in Church and Agonize

References

External links
 Carbonized at Discogs
 Carbonized at Encyclopaedia Metallum
 
 Carbonized at MusicMight

Swedish death metal musical groups
Swedish progressive metal musical groups
Musical groups established in 1988
Musical groups disestablished in 1996
Swedish musical trios